Garrison Redd (born 1988 in Brownsville, NY) is a paralympic athlete. He was a Team USA Paralympic powerlifter. Redd was paralyzed in 2005 after being struck by a stray bullet outside his home in Brownsville. The bullet burned the nerves in his spine leaving him paralyzed from the waist down.

In February 2018, Redd was chosen as a TEDx speaker.

Redd competed in a national qualifier held at Logan University to represent Team USA in Bogota, Colombia.

Redd is also involved with the Christopher and Dana Reeve Foundation.

References 

1988 births
Living people